Arthur Victor Agar-Robartes, 8th Viscount Clifden, MC (9 June 1887 – 22 December 1974) was a British Army officer and English cricketer.

Early life
Agar-Robartes was the youngest son of Thomas Agar-Robartes, 6th Viscount Clifden, and his wife Mary (née Dickenson). He was educated at Eton College, before attending Brasenose College, Oxford. He was a member of the Bullingdon Club during his time at Oxford. Agar-Robartes was a keen recreational cricketer, playing once for Cornwall in a Minor Counties Championship match in 1904, which was played at his Lanhydrock home.

Military service
Agar-Robartes served in the First World War. He was first mentioned in dispatches in 1915, as a machine-gun officer in the 2nd Battalion Grenadier Guards. He was wounded three times during the course of the war: 8 October 1915, 14 September 1916 and 23 March 1918. He reached the rank of Major and was awarded the Military Cross. His brother, Thomas Agar-Robartes, was killed in action in 1915, being recommended posthumously for the Victoria Cross.

Later life
He succeeded to the viscountcy when his brother, the 7th Viscount Clifden died in July 1966.

Lord Clifden died in December 1974, aged 87. He had married Patience Mary Basset in 1920 but died without male issue, and upon his death all his titles, with the exception of the barony of Mendip (inherited by a distant cousin, Shaun Agar, 6th Earl of Normanton) became extinct. His body is interred at Lanhydrock Parish Church. His daughter Rachel married Captain Cromwell Lloyd-Davies, RN.

References

 

1887 births
1974 deaths
Viscounts in the Peerage of Ireland
People educated at Eton College
Alumni of Brasenose College, Oxford
People from Lanhydrock
British Army personnel of World War I
Grenadier Guards officers
Recipients of the Military Cross
English cricketers
Cornwall cricketers
Burials in Cornwall
Arthur